In human–computer interaction, a command verb is a verb that appears in a user interface and is used for the user to tell the computer to do something (rather than vice versa).  For instance, the words "edit" and "view" and "help" that appear in the Web browser menu are all clearly verbs. Other items such as "file" or "favorites" or "tools" are nouns, but the verb appears in the submenu, for instance, "save", "open", "send", "treat", "add to", or "organize".

A Web page typically includes a few such verbs also, typically including "search", "log in" and perhaps "edit this page".

A reflexive user interface is one in which commands and perhaps other controls are defined in the interface itself.

User interfaces